Royal Noble Consort Hui of the Indong Jang clan (Hangul: 희빈 장씨, Hanja: 禧嬪 張氏; 3 November 1659 – 9 November 1701), personal name Jang Ok-jeong (Hangul: 장옥정, Hanja: 張玉貞), was a consort of King Sukjong of Joseon and the mother of King Gyeongjong. She was the Queen of Joseon from 1689 until her deposition, in 1694.

Biography

Early life
Jang Ok-jeong was the daughter of Jang Hyeong and his second wife, Lady Yun of the Papyeong Yun clan. Part of the Namin faction, she came from a long line of interpreters and belonged to the Jungin class.

Ok-jeong is widely thought to have been one of the most beautiful women in Joseon, and her charm was mentioned in the Annals.

She became a lady-in-waiting to the King's step-great-grandmother, Grand Queen Dowager Jaui, at the recommendation of Prince Dongpyeong, who was Sukjong's first cousin-once-removed and Jaui's step-grandson.

Life as royal consort
While visiting Queen Jaui, the King became infatuated with Ok-jeong's beauty and gave her the rank of Seungeun Sanggung (or Favored Sanggung; 승은 상궁), but his mother, Queen Dowager Hyeonyeol, who belonged to the Seoin faction, feared that Jang Ok-jeong would influence him to favor the Namin, so she expelled her from the palace.

In 1683, Hyeonyeol died and Queen Min, Sukjong's wife at that time (posthumously known as Queen Inhyeon), allowed Lady Jang to return to court.

In 1686, Ok-jeong became a concubine with the rank of Sug-won (숙원, 淑媛). In 1688, she was elevated to So-ui (소의, 昭儀), after giving birth to the King's first son, Yi Yun.

In the court, the Seoin faction split into Noron (Old Learning), led by Song Si-yeol, and Soron (New Learning), led by Yun Jeung. The Noron was supported by Queen Inhyeon.

The Namin faction pushed for the King to acknowledge Yi Yun as heir apparent, but the Seoin faction insisted that the Queen was still young and could bear a son, who should be the heir. Sukjong pushed for a compromise in which the Queen would adopt Yi Yun as her son. However, she refused to do so. Sukjong became angry at the opposition, and many were killed, including Song Si-yeol. The Namin faction seized power, and they exiled the Queen's father and the leaders of the Seoin faction.

In March 1688, Queen Inhyeon was also deposed and exiled. This incident is called Gisa Hwanguk (기사환국).

In that same year, Jang So-ui was promoted to Bin (빈, 嬪), the highest rank for a consort, with the prefix Hui (禧), which means "beautiful". Later, Jang Hui-bin was appointed as Queen Consort.

In 1693, Sukjong's new favorite, a palace maid from the Haeju Choe clan, was officially elevated to a royal concubine of the Sug-won rank. Choe Sug-won (later Choe Suk-bin), was an open supporter of Queen Min and encouraged the King to reinstate her to her original position. In the meantime, Kim Chun-taek, who was member of the Noron faction, and Han Jung-hyuk from the Soron faction, staged a campaign to reinstate the Deposed Queen.

In 1694, Jang Ok-jeong lost the favor of the King. Sukjong grew disgusted by the greed of the Namin faction and the ever-powerful Jang family. He also felt remorse for his temperamental actions during Gisa Hwanguk. In the government, the Namin faction's attempt to purge the Seoin on the charge of plotting to reinstate the Deposed Queen backfired.

Later years and death
The King banished Jang Hui-jae, Queen Jang's older brother, and the leaders of the Namin party. He officially demoted Jang Ok-jeong to her former position, Hui-bin, and reinstated the Deposed Queen Min. This incident is called Gapsul Hwanguk (갑술환국). The Namin faction would never politically recover from this purge.

The Soron faction supported Crown Prince Yi Yun, who was Jang Hui-bin's son, while the Noron faction supported Yi Geum, Prince Yeoning, who was Choe Suk-bin's son.

In 1701, Queen Inhyeon died of an unknown disease. Allegedly, Sukjong discovered Lady Jang conspiring with a shaman priestess to curse the Queen with black magic and gloating over her death. The Soron faction pleaded with the King to show mercy and pointed out that she was the mother of the Crown Prince.

Unmoved, the King sentenced Hui-bin, her mother, her brother, the leader of Soron and all of her companions to death. 1700 people died as a result of the incident. He also exiled the courtiers who had asked him to spare Lady Jang's life.

On the 7th day of the 10th month in the 27th year of his reign (November 7, 1701), Sukjong passed a decree prohibiting any concubine from ever becoming Queen, and on November 9, 1701, Jang Hui-bin was executed by poisoning at Chuseondang Hall, her residence inside Changgyeong Palace. She was 42 years old.

Burial
Her tomb is called Daebinmyo and was originally located in Gwangju, Gyeonggi Province, but in June 1969 it was moved to the Seooneung Cluster, in Deogyang District, Goyang, Gyeonggi Province, near Myeongneung, which contains the tombs of King Sukjong and two of his wives, Queen Inhyeon and Queen Inwon. The relocation took place because the tomb was blocking the government's planned expansion of the city.

Behind the tomb is a large rock, and a pine tree has broken through the rock to grow. There is speculation that this reveals that Jang Hui-bin's ki (energy) was, and still is, very strong. Some Korean websites report that because Lady Jang was such a strong woman there is a belief that if young, single women who want a boyfriend visit the tomb and pay a tribute, they will soon find love.

Her memorial tablet was enshrined in Chilgung (or the "Palace Of Seven Royal Concubines").

Ancestry

Family
 Father: Jang Hyeong (장형) (25 February 1623 – 12 January 1669)
 Grandfather: Jang Eung-in (장응인)
 Grandmother: Lady Park of the Nampo Park clan (남포 박씨)
 Mother: Lady Yun of the Papyeong Yun clan (파평 윤씨) (1626 – 1698)
 Grandfather: Yun Seong-rib (윤성립)
 Grandmother: Lady Byeon of the Chogye Byeon clan (초계 변씨)
 Step-mother: Lady Go of the Jeju Go clan (제주 고씨, 濟州 髙氏) (? – 1645)
 Step-grandfather: Go Seong-rib (고성립, 高誠立)

Sibling(s)

 Older half-brother: Jang Hui-sik (장희식) (1640 – ?)
 Sister-in-law: Lady Yi (이씨)
 Older sister: Lady Jang (장씨)
 Brother-in-law: Kim Ji-jong (김지중)
 Unnamed nephew
 Unnamed nephew 
 Unnamed nephew
 Lady Kim (김씨)
 Older brother: Jang Hui-jae (장희재) (1651 – 29 October 1701)
 Sister-in-law: Lady Kim of the Gyeongju Kim clan (경주 김씨) (? – 12 December 1701)
 Unnamed nephew
 Nephew: Jang Cha-gyeong (장차경)
 Nephew: Jang Hwi (장휘) (? – 11 April 1728)
 Sister-in-law: Ahn Sook-jeong (안숙정) (1666 – 3 October 1701)
 Nephew: Jang Jong-gyeong (장종경) (? – 1 April 1724)
 Niece-in-law: Sil-ae (실애, 實愛)
Unnamed niece-in-law

Husband
Yi Sun, King Sukjong of Joseon (이순 조선 숙종) (7 October 1661 – 12 July 1720)
 Mother-in-law: Queen Myeongseong of the Cheongpung Kim clan (명성왕후 김씨) (13 June 1642 – 21 January 1684)
 Father-in-law: King Hyeonjong of Joseon (조선 현종) (14 March 1641 – 17 September 1674)

Issue
 Son: Yi Yun, King Gyeongjong of Joseon (이윤 조선 경종) (20 November 1688 – 11 October 1724)
 Daughter-in-law: Queen Danui of the Cheongsong Shim clan (단의왕후 심씨) (11 July 1686 – 8 March 1718)
 Daughter-in-law: Queen Seonui of the Hamjong Eo clan (선의왕후 어씨) (14 December 1705 – 12 August 1730)
 Son: Prince Seongsu (성수군) (19 July 1690 – 16 September 1690) — disputed

In popular culture
 Portrayed by Kim Ji-mee in the 1961 film Jang Hui-bin. 
 Portrayed by Nam Jeong-im in the 1968 film Femme Fatale, Jang Hee-bin. 
 Portrayed by Youn Yuh-jung in the 1971 MBC TV series Jang Hui-bin. 
 Portrayed by Lee Mi-sook in the 1981 MBC TV series Women of History: Jang Hui-bin.
 Portrayed by Jun In-hwa in the 1988 MBC TV series 500 Years of Joseon Dynasty: Queen Inhyeon.
 Portrayed by Jung Sun-kyung in 1995 SBS TV series Jang Hee Bin.
 Portrayed by Kim Hye-soo in the 2002 KBS2 TV series Royal Story: Jang Hui-bin.
 Interpreted by Yoon Se-ah in the movie Shadows In The Palace 2007.
 Portrayed by Lee So-yeon in the 2010 MBC TV series Dong Yi. 
 Portrayed by Choi Woo-ri in the 2012 tvN TV series Queen Inhyun's Man.
 Portrayed by Kim Tae-hee and Kang Min-ah in the 2013 SBS TV series Jang Ok-jung, Living by Love.
 Parodied by members of the pop band Shinhwa in the 25 August 2012 episode of JTBC variety show Shinhwa Broadcasting.
Portrayed by Oh Yeon-ah in the 2015 SBS TV series Jackpot.

References

	

17th-century Korean people
1701 deaths
Year of birth unknown
1659 births
17th-century Korean women
Korean ladies-in-waiting
Royal consorts of the Joseon dynasty
Korean queens consort
Indong Jang clan
People executed by poison
People executed for witchcraft
Asian witchcraft